Consort Jing may refer to:

Erdeni Bumba ( 17th century), wife of the Shunzhi Emperor
Empress Xiaojingcheng (1812–1855), concubine of the Daoguang Emperor

See also
Empress Zhu (Eastern Wu) (died 265), posthumous name Empress Jing